The 1976 Holy Cross Crusaders football team was an American football team that represented the College of the Holy Cross as an independent during the 1976 NCAA Division I football season. Neil Wheelwright joined the team for his first year as head coach. The team compiled a record of 3–8.

All home games were played at Fitton Field on the Holy Cross campus in Worcester, Massachusetts.

Schedule

Statistical leaders
Statistical leaders for the 1976 Crusaders included: 
 Rushing: Brian Doherty, 660 yards and 7 touchdowns on 106 attempts
 Passing: Bob Morton, 797 yards, 68 completions and 2 touchdowns on 161 attempts
 Receiving: Craig Cerretani, 445 yards and 1 touchdown on 39 receptions
 Scoring: Brian Doherty, 50 points from 8 touchdowns and 1 two-point conversion
 Total offense: Bob Morton, 1,256 yards (797 passing, 459 rushing)
 All-purpose yards: Brian Doherty, 796 yards (660 rushing, 102  returning, 34 receiving)
 Interceptions: Mark Cannon, 3 interceptions for 43 yards

References

Holy Cross
Holy Cross Crusaders football seasons
Holy Cross Crusaders football